The decade of the 1640s in archaeology involved some significant events.

Explorations
 1649: John Aubrey describes the megaliths at Avebury, England.

Excavations

Finds

Publications
 1643: Athanasius Kircher, Lingua Aegyptiaca Restituta.
 1646: John Greaves, Pyramidographia, or a Description of the Pyramids in Ægypt.

Events

Births
 1646: April 4 - Antoine Galland (d. 1715).
 1647: Jacques Spon, French doctor and archaeologist (d. 1685).

Deaths

References

Archaeology by decade
Archaeology